Victoria Wright (born Victoria Hristova; 1 May 1974) is a former Bulgarian badminton player, and later represented France. She competed for Bulgaria at the first edition of the badminton at the Summer Olympics in Barcelona. In Bulgaria, she won nine times National Championships title, 4 in the women's singles and 5 in the women's doubles event. She competed for France at the 2004 Summer Olympics in the mixed doubles event partnered with the former Bulgarian player Svetoslav Stoyanov. They lost to Jens Eriksen and Mette Schjoldager of Denmark in the round of 32. Wright won the French National Championships title, 2 times in the women's doubles event partnered with Tatiana Vattier, and 3 in the mixed doubles event with Stoyanov.

Achievements

IBF International 
Women's singles

Women's doubles

Mixed doubles

References

External links 
 
 
 
  (2004 Summer Olympics)
 
  (1992 Summer Olympics)

1974 births
Living people
Sportspeople from Pazardzhik
French people of Bulgarian descent
French female badminton players
Olympic badminton players of France
Badminton players at the 2004 Summer Olympics
Bulgarian female badminton players
Olympic badminton players of Bulgaria
Badminton players at the 1992 Summer Olympics